The Durham County RFU Senior Cup is an annual rugby union knock-out club competition organized by the Durham County Rugby Football Union.  It was first introduced during the 1880-81 season, with the inaugural winners being Sunderland Rovers (a forerunner to Sunderland RFC) who defeated Houghton 3 tries to 0 in the final.  

During the 1880s the competition used the archaic rugby union points systems of games being scored by goals, which were seen as more important than tries back then.  It was only if both teams had not scored any goals, that tries would then be used to determine games, with the highest number winning.  By the 1890s this system was changed to one which we are more familiar with today, using tries, conversions, drop goals (and later penalties).  Today, the Durham Senior Cup remains the most important rugby union cup competition for club sides in County Durham, ahead of the Intermediate Cup, Junior Cup and Plate competitions.

The Senior Cup is currently open to club sides based in County Durham and occasionally, Tyne and Wear, who play between tier 3 (National League 1) and tier 5 (North Premier) of the English rugby union league system, although higher ranked clubs tend to field reserve sides due to the demands of league rugby.  The current format is a knockout cup with a semi-finals and a final to be held at the ground of one of the finalists.  Previously the cup final was held at a pre-determined venue but this has changed in recent seasons.

Durham County RFU Senior Cup winners

Number of wins
Hartlepool Rovers (45)
Durham City (19)
West Hartlepool (15)
Westoe (8)
Darlington Mowden Park (7)
Blaydon (5)
Stockton (5)
Sunderland (5)
Tudhoe (4)
Darlington (3)
North Durham (2)
Billingham (1)
Houghton (1)
Ryton (1)

Notes

See also
 Durham County RFU
 Intermediate Cup
 Junior Cup
 Plate
 English rugby union system
 Rugby union in England

References

External links
 Durham County RFU

Recurring sporting events established in 1880
1880 establishments in England
Rugby union cup competitions in England
Rugby union in County Durham